Bridge Creek may refer to:

Places in the United States
Bridge Creek, Missouri
Bridge Creek, Wisconsin
Bridge Creek, Oklahoma
Bridge Creek Township, Ouachita County, Arkansas

Bodies of water
Bridge Creek (British Columbia), Canada
Bridge Creek (Fabius River tributary), a stream in Missouri, U.S.
Bridge Creek (Oregon), a tributary of the John Day River, U.S.
Bridge Creek Wilderness
Bridge Creek Wildlife Area
Bridge Creek, a tributary of the East Branch Wallenpaupack Creek in the Poconos of eastern Pennsylvania, U.S.
Bridge Creek Reservoir, a lake in Kenai Peninsula Borough, Alaska, U.S.
Bridge Creek Reservoir, a lake in Rosebud County, Montana, U.S.

See also
Bridges Creek, Virginia
Bridge River (disambiguation)